XEX may refer to

Radio stations 

XEX-TDT (channel 14, virtual 5) in Altzomoni, Méx.
XEX-AM, 730 kHz in Mexico City
XEX-FM, 101.7 MHz in Mexico City

Other uses 
 Xor–encrypt–xor (XEX), a (tweakable) mode of operation of a block cipher.
 Morimoto XEX, the Michelin Star-winning Tokyo restaurant of Masaharu Morimoto.